Eva Rosenhed (born 8 December 1939) is a Swedish female curler.

She is a two-time  and three-time Swedish women's champion.

In 1977 she was inducted into the Swedish Curling Hall of Fame.

Teams

References

External links
 

Living people
1939 births
Swedish female curlers
European curling champions
Swedish curling champions